This is a list of defunct newspapers of Germany.

References

Germany, Defunct
Germany